The Piracy Act 1721 (c.24) was an Act of the Parliament of Great Britain.

The long title and preamble of the Act were:

Parts of the Act were superseded by the Piracy Act 1837.

All remaining parts of the Act were repealed on 5 November 1993 by the Statute Law (Repeals) Act 1993.

See also
1717–1718 Acts of Grace

References

External links
 Text of the Piracy Act 1721 as originally enacted
 

Great Britain Acts of Parliament 1721
Repealed Great Britain Acts of Parliament
Piracy law
Piracy in the United Kingdom